Mein may refer to:

People
 Alexander Mein (1854–1927), British soldier who played on the winning side in the 1875 FA Cup Final
 Hannie Mein (1933-2003), Dutch ceramist.
 John Gordon Mein (1913-1968), a United States ambassador to Guatemala, the first to be assassinated while in service
 Will G. Mein (1866 -1939), a British book illustrator who flourished in the late 19th to early 20th century
 William Mein Smith, (1799-1869), a key actor in the early settlement of New Zealand's capital city, Wellington

Other
 Mein clan, an ethnic group living along the Forcados River in Delta State, Nigeria
 Mein (noodles), a variety of Chinese noodles made from wheat
 "Mein" (song), a song by the band Deftones, featuring System of a Down singer Serj Tankian
 "Mein!", in Schubert's song cycle Die schöne Müllerin
 Écoust-Saint-Mein, a commune in the Pas-de-Calais department in France

See also
 Mien (disambiguation)
 Mine (disambiguation)
Surnames from given names